A&B Productions is a Pakistani television production company by Asif Raza Mir and Babar Javed which produces Pakistani television serials, and soap operas for private channels in Pakistan. The company has mostly collaborated with Geo TV.

Programs produced

References

External links

A&B Entertainment
Television production companies of Pakistan